Abu al-Fath Jamal al-Din Yusuf bin Yaqoub bin Muhammad, better known as Ibn al-Mujawir (1205–1292) was a traveller and businessman of uncertain origin, perhaps from Khurasan. He is known for his travelogue Tarikh al-Mustabsir or Tarikh al-Mustansir (Chronicle of an intelligent observer), a travel chronicle describing cities, commerce, local dynasties and social mores of the southern Arabian Peninsula. The chronicle is an important source for the economic history and popular life of the southern areas of the Arabian Peninsula and the isle of Socotra in the early 13th century.

He travelled from Mecca south through the Red Sea, and along the southern coast of the Arabian Peninsula to the Persian Gulf. In Aden, at that time at the beginning of its medieval prosperity under the Ayyubids, he observed the activities of the port to report on its administration, taxes, markets, customs, currency, weights and measures. His route then continued along the southern coast of Arabia, where he described the historical connections of the Gulf of Aden to India adapting the Indian epic of the Ramayana.

He described the habits of the people: buildings, dress, agriculture, food and history. He also had an ear for their manners, tales and myths. He described maritime contacts between Madagascar, the East African coast, Aden and Siraf, the Persian golf port. He mapped cities in the style of the Balkhi school.

Notes and references

Further reading
 G. Rex Smith, A Traveller in Thirteenth-Century Arabia / Ibn al-Mujawir's Tarikh al-Mustabsir, 2022, .
 Shahla Bakhtiari, The Theoretical Approach of Ibn al-Mujawir in Tarikh al-Mustabsir, Teheran, 2020.

13th-century Arabs
13th-century geographers
Geographers of the medieval Islamic world
Travel writers of the medieval Islamic world
13th-century travelers
Balkhi school

1205 births
1292 deaths